Pyridine-3-carbaldehyde, also known as nicotinaldehyde, is an organic compound with the formula C5H4NCHO.  It is one of three isomeric pyridinaldehydes.  The other isomers are pyridine-2-carboxaldehyde and pyridine-4-carboxaldehyde.  It is a colorless liquid that is routinely available commercially. It can be produced from nicotinonitrile. Alternatively, it arises by the aerobic oxidation of the corresponding alcohol.

Safety
3-Pyridinecarboxaldehyde is a severe skin irritant.

References 

Aromatic aldehydes
3-Pyridyl compounds